Hedgehog mushroom is a common name of several fungi species and may refer to:

Hydnum repandum
Hericium erinaceus